Vladykino railway station may refer to either of two nearby stations on the Moscow Metro:

Vladykino (Moscow Central Circle), on line 14
Vladykino (Serpukhovsko–Timiryazevskaya line), on line 9